Chelmsford Cathedral in the city of Chelmsford, Essex, United Kingdom, is dedicated to St Mary the Virgin, St Peter and St Cedd. It became a cathedral when the Anglican Diocese of Chelmsford was created in 1914 and is the seat of the Bishop of Chelmsford.

History

Parish church

The church of St Mary the Virgin in Chelmsford was probably first built along with the town around 1200. It was rebuilt in the 15th and early 16th centuries (starting around 1520), with walls of flint rubble, stone and brick. The church has a tower with a spire and a ring of thirteen bells, twelve of which were cast by John Warner & Sons at Cripplegate and were dedicated in 1913. The nave partially collapsed in 1800, and was rebuilt by the County architect John Johnson, retaining the Perpendicular design, but using Coade stone piers and tracery, and a plaster ceiling. The upper part of the chancel was  rebuilt in 1878.

Cathedral

In 1914 the church became the cathedral for the newly created diocese of Chelmsford.

The south porch was extended in 1953 to mark Anglo-American friendship after World War II and the many US airmen stationed in Essex. In 1954, the cathedral was additionally dedicated to Saints Peter and Cedd. In 1983, the interior of the cathedral was extensively refurbished, with a new floor, seating, altar, bishop's throne, font and artwork. In 1994 and 1995 two pipe organs were installed, the first in the nave and the second in the chancel. The stained-glass windows were all installed in the 19th and 20th centuries.

In 2000 a sculpture, Christ in Glory by Peter Eugene Ball, was placed above the chancel arch. In 2004 two further major works of art were commissioned, and are now in place: Mark Cazelet's Tree of Life painting in the North Transept, and Philip Sanderson's altar frontal in the Mildmay Chapel.

The cathedral celebrates its links with Thomas Hooker, who was Chelmsford Town Lecturer between 1626 and 1629. He fled to the New World because of his Puritan views and founded the town of Hartford, Connecticut and was one of the founders of American democracy.

Dean and chapter
As of 8 August 2019:
Dean – Nicholas Henshall (installed 2 February 2014)
Vice Dean & Canon Pastor – Ivor Moody (canon, Vice Dean & Pastor since 17 April 2010 installation)
Canon for Worship & Music (i.e., precentor) and Tutor in Liturgy and Worship, St Mellitus College – Alison Kennedy (since 16 September 2018 installation)
Canon for Evangelism & Discipleship (i.e., Missioner) – Imogen Nay (since 16 June 2019 installation)

Music

The cathedral music department, led by the Organist and Master of the Choristers, includes the Assistant Organist and Director of the Girls' Choir, Organ Scholar, Music and Liturgy Assistant and Choir Matron.
The cathedral choir consists of boys and a combination of school age and postgraduate choral scholars, lay clerks, and volunteer singers. The choir sings the daily choral services and the Eucharist and Evensong on Sundays. 
The Cathedral Girls' Choir sings Evensong on Tuesdays and every other Thursday and on a number of Sundays each term; their annual performance of Benjamin Britten's A Ceremony of Carols has become a highlight of the Cathedral's preparations for Christmas.
The Voluntary Choir was formed in 2001 and sang at services often during the holiday periods after Christmas, Easter and through the summer; the choir was disbanded in 2017.
The cathedral choir contributed choral passages to "I Believe in You", a track on Talk Talk's 1988 album Spirit of Eden.

Cathedral organs 
The Nave Organ is situated at the west end of the cathedral under the Tower. It is a four-manual instrument with mechanical action built by Mander Organs in 1994.
The Chancel Organ is a two manual mechanical instrument built by Mander Organs in 1995. It incorporates 19th-century pipework by Hill and Holdich and is widely admired for its character and versatility. The Nave Organ's great, swell, solo and pedal divisions can be played via an electric link from the Chancel Organ console.

A specification of the organs can be found at the National Pipe Organ Register.

Directors of Music
182? Charles Ambrose
1876 Frederick Frye
1945 Roland Middleton (later Organist of Chester Cathedral)
1949 Stanley Vann (later Master of the Music at Peterborough Cathedral)
1953 Derrick Edward Cantrell (later Organist of Manchester Cathedral)
1962 Philip Ledger (later Director of Music at King's College, Cambridge)
1965 John Willam Jordan
1981 Graham Elliott
1999 Peter Nardone (later Organist and Director of Music at Worcester Cathedral)
2012 James Davy [job title changed to Organist and Master of the Choristers in 2013]

Assistant Organists
     Geoffrey Becket
1963 John Jordan
1966 Peter Cross
1968 David Sparrow
1986 Timothy Allen
1991 Neil Weston

Assistant Directors of Music
1999 Edward Wellman
2003 Robert Poyser (later Director of Music at Beverley Minster)
2008 Tom Wilkinson (later Organist at the University of St Andrews, Scotland)
2009 Oliver Waterer (later Organist at St. David's Cathedral)
2013 Laurence Lyndon-Jones
2019 Hilary Punnett

Gallery

See also
List of cathedrals in the United Kingdom

References

Bibliography
 Essex Chronicle newspaper article, 14 July 2011, pp. 4–5.

External links

 Chelmsford Cathedral website

Churches in Chelmsford (town)
Anglican cathedrals in England
Grade I listed churches in Essex
Grade I listed cathedrals
English Gothic architecture in Essex
Provosts and Deans of Chelmsford